The 2016 FC Shakhter Karagandy season is the 25th successive season that the club will play in the Kazakhstan Premier League, the highest tier of association football in Kazakhstan. Shakhter Karagandy will also be participating in the Kazakhstan Cup.

On 3 August, Jozef Vukušič resigned as manager, with Aleksei Yeryomenko being appointed his successor the following day.

Squad

Reserve team

Transfers

Winter

In:

Out:

Trialists:

Summer

In:

Out:

Friendlies

Competitions

Kazakhstan Premier League

Regular season

Results summary

Results by round

Results

League table

Relegation round

Results summary

Results by round

Results

League table

Kazakhstan Cup

Squad statistics

Appearances and goals

|-
|colspan="14"|Players away from Shakhter Karagandy on loan:
|-
|colspan="14"|Players who appeared for Shakhter Karagandy that left during the season:

|}

Goal scorers

Disciplinary record

References

External links
Official Website

FC Shakhter Karagandy seasons
Shakhter Karagandy